The 2011 ICC World Cricket League Division Three was a cricket tournament that took place between 22–29 January 2011. It formed part of the ICC World Cricket League. Hong Kong hosted the event and also ran out winners.

Teams
The teams that took part in the tournament were decided according to the results of the 2009 ICC World Cup Qualifier, the 2009 ICC World Cricket League Division Three and the 2010 ICC World Cricket League Division Four.

Squads

Fixtures

Group stage

Points table

Matches

Playoffs

5th place playoff

3rd place playoff

Final

Statistics

Most runs
The top five highest run scorers (total runs) in the season are included in this table.

Most wickets
The following table contains the five leading wicket-takers of the season.

Final placings

After the conclusion of the tournament the teams were distributed as follows:

See also
ICC World Cricket League

References

External links

2011 Division Three